The coats of arms of the House of Habsburg were the heraldic emblems of their members and their territories, such as Austria-Hungary and the Austrian Empire. Historian Michel Pastoureau says that the original purpose of heraldic emblems and seals was to facilitate the exercise of power and the identification of the ruler, due to they offered for achieving these aims. These symbols were associated with the kingdom, and eventually also represented the intangible nature of the national sentiment or sense of belonging to a territory.

A complete listing of the arms can be found at the Habsburg Armory.

Heraldry

Arms of Dominion of the Austro-Hungarian Empire
The arms of dominion began to take on a life of their own in the 19th century as the idea of the state as independent from the Habsburg dynasty took root. They are the national arms as borne by a sovereign in his capacity as head of state and represent the state as separate from the person of the monarch or his dynasty. That very idea had been, heretofore, foreign to the concept of the Habsburg state. The state had been the personal property of the Habsburg dynasty. Since the states, territories, and nationalities represented were in many cases only united to the Austro-Hungarian Empire by their historic loyalty to the head of the house of Habsburg as hereditary lord, these full ("grand") arms of dominion of Austria-Hungary reflect the complex political infrastructure that was necessarily to accommodate the many different nationalities and groupings within the empire after the Austro-Hungarian Compromise of 1867.

After 1867 the eastern part of the empire, also called Transleithania, was mostly under the domination of the Kingdom of Hungary. The shield integrated the arms of the kingdom of Hungary, with two angels and supporters and the crown of St. Stephen, along with the territories that were subject to it:

The Kingdom of Dalmatia, the Kingdom of Croatia, the Kingdom of Slavonia (conjoined with Croatia as the Kingdom of Croatia-Slavonia - formally known as the Triune Kingdom of Croatia, Slavonia, and Dalmatia, although the claim to Dalmatia was mostly de jure), the Great Principality of Transylvania, the Condominium of Bosnia and Herzegovina (1915–1918), the City of Fiume and its district (modern Rijeka), and in the center, the Kingdom of Hungary.

The western or Austrian part of the empire, Cisleithania, continued using the shield of the Empire in 1815 but with the seals of various member territories located around the central shield. Paradoxically, some of these coats of arms belonged to the territories that were part of the Hungarian part of the empire and shield. This shield, the most frequently used until 1915, was known as the middle shield. There was also the small shield, with just the personal arms of the Habsburgs, as used in 1815.

In 1915, in the middle of World War I, Austria-Hungary adopted a heraldic composition uniting the shield that was used in the Hungarian part, also known as the Lands of the Crown of St. Stephen, with a new version of the medium shield of the Austrian part as depicted above in the section on the mainline of the Emperors of Austria.

Before 1915, the arms of the different territories of the Austrian part of the Empire (heraldry was added to some areas not shown in the previous version and to the left to the Hungarian part) appeared together in the shield positioned on the double-headed eagle coat of arms of the Austrian Empire as an inescutcheon. The eagle was inside a shield with a goldfield. The latter shield was supported by two griffins and was topped by the Austrian Imperial Crown (previously these items were included only in the large shield). Then, shown in the center of both arms of dominion, as an inescutcheon to the inescutcheon, is the small shield, i.e. personal arms, of the Habsburgs. All this was surrounded by the collar Order of the Golden Fleece.

In the heraldic composition of 1915, the shields of the two foci of the empire, Austria and Hungary, were brought together. The griffin supporter on the left was added for Austria and an angel on the right as a supporter for Hungary. The center featured the personal arms of the Habsburgs (Habsburg, Austria, and Lorraine). This small shield was topped with a royal crown and surrounded by the collar of the Order of the Golden Fleece, below which was the Military Order of Maria Theresa, below which was the collars of the Orders of St. Stephen's and Leopold. At the bottom was the motto that read "AC INDIVISIBILITER INSEPARABILITER" ("indivisible and inseparable"). Other simplified versions did not have the supports depicted, and the simple shields of Austria and Hungary. These were the arms of the Empire of Austria with an inescutcheon of Austria, and the Arms of Hungary (with chequer of Croatia at the tip).

References

Austrian coats of arms
Coats of arms of former countries
Royal arms of European monarchs
House of Habsburg